Willingdon Down is a  biological Site of Special Scientific Interest west of Willingdon, a suburb of Eastbourne in East Sussex. Part of it is a Neolithic causewayed enclosure which is a Scheduled Monument

This steeply sloping site on the South Downs is species-rich chalk grassland, a nationally uncommon type of habitat. The dominant grasses are sheep's fescue and upright brome and uncommon plants include field fleawort, bee orchid, round headed rampion, green winged orchid and burnt orchid.

The site is public open access land.

References

Sites of Special Scientific Interest in East Sussex